The SPL Satakunnan piiri (Satakunta Football Association) is one of the 12 district organisations of the Football Association of Finland. It administers lower tier football in Satakunta.

Background 

Suomen Palloliitto Satakunnan piiri, commonly referred to as SPL Satakunnan piiri or SPL Satakunta, is the governing body for football in Satakunta. SPL Satakunta was founded in 1934, as the SPL Häme-Satakunta-district was divided into two associations. Based in Pori, the Association's Director is Janne Koivisto.

Member clubs

League Competitions 
SPL Satakuntan piiri run the following league competitions:

Men's Football
 Division 3 - Kolmonen  -  one section
 Division 4 - Nelonen  -  one section
 Division 5 - Vitonen  -  one section

Ladies Football
 Division 3 - Kolmonen  -  one section

SPL Satakunta champions
The SPL Satakunta clubs have played for the district's championship title since 1934 (ladies 1972).

Champions of the 2000s
Men/Ladies:

2000 FC Jazz/Pallo-Iirot
2001 FC Rauma/NiceFutis
2002 FC Jazz/Pallo-Iirot
2003 MuSa/Pallo-Iirot
2004 FC Jazz/Pallo-Iirot
2005 PoPa/Pallo-Iirot

2006 PoPa/NiceFutis
2007 FC PoPa/NiceFutis
2008 FC PoPa/KoPa
2009 FC PoPa/NiceFutis
2010 Pallo-Iirot/MuSa
2011 MuSa/NiceFutis

List of championship titles

Men:
PPT / FC Jazz 18
FC PoPa 14
RU-38 12
Rauman Pallo 10
Pallo-Iirot 6
Ässät 3
MuSa 3
Kärpät 2
FC Rauma 1
Hakrit 1
PoPS 1
RTU Rauma 1
UTU Rauma 1

Ladies:
MuSa 13
Pallo-Iirot 11
NiceFutis 8
Rauman Pallo 3
FC Rauma 1
KoPa 1
PPT 1
Ässät 1

The Golden Shoe award
Satakunnan Kultakenkä - The Satakunta Golden Shoe is a yearly award for the best player of SPL Satakunta clubs. First award was presented in 1984 (ladies award in 2007).

1984 Petri Sulonen, PPT
1985 Jarmo Alatensiö, PPT
1986 Petri Sulonen, PPT
1987 Jarmo Alatensiö, PPT
1988 Risto Koskikangas, PPT
1989 Saku Laaksonen, PPT
1990 Pasi Sulonen, PPT
1991 Rami Nieminen, PPT
1992 Tommi Koivistoinen, FC Jazz
1993 Antti Sumiala, FC Jazz
1994 Vesa Rantanen, FC Jazz
1995 Rami Nieminen, FC Jazz
1996 Juha Riippa, FC Jazz
1997 Rami Hakanpää, FC Jazz
1998 Jyrki Rovio, FC Jazz
1999 Rami Hakanpää, FC Jazz
2000 Rami Nieminen, FC Jazz
2001 Juha Luoma, FC Jazz
2002 Marko Koivuranta, FC Jazz
2003 Teemu Vihtilä, FC Jazz
2004 Juha Luoma, FC Jazz
2005 Petteri Pitkänen, Pallo-Iirot
2006 Teemu Vihtilä, FC PoPa
2007 Juha Luoma, FC PoPa / Reetta Turtiainen, NiceFutis
2008 Lauri Pirhonen, FC PoPa / Anu Hoffren, NiceFutis
2009 William de Mattia, FC PoPa / Maiju Hirvonen, NiceFutis
2010 Samu-Petteri Mäkelä, FC PoPa / Anna Auvinen, NiceFutis
2011 Juho Patola, Pallo-Iirot / Siiri Välimaa, NiceFutis
2012 Kimmo Hörkkö, Pallo-Iirot / Siiri Välimaa, NiceFutis
2013 Toni Junnila, FC Jazz / Siiri Välimaa, NiceFutis

Footnotes

References

External links 
 SPL Satakuntan piiri Official Website 

Finnish District Football Associations
Sports organizations established in 1934